Home Hardware (previously known as Home Timber & Hardware) is an Australian retail hardware chain. It is Australia's third-biggest hardware chain after Bunnings Warehouse and Mitre 10, the latter of which is its parent company. 

Home is known for its distinctive advertisements with two animated dog mascots: Rusty (voiced by Vic Plume) and Sandy (voiced by Greg Fleet), often making fun of or pointing out perceived flaws of another unnamed hardware store — usually implied to be Bunnings. Home nicknames its catalogues "dogalogues", in reference to Rusty and Sandy.

Home Hardware sells paint, general hardware, power tools and garden products to the DIY market.

The brand was launched in 1993 by manufacturing and wholesaler John Danks & Son following the merger of the Homestead and Homesaver brands while in South Australia, they also absorbed a few Lloyds & Banner stores. This began a long companionship with fellow Danks chain, Thrifty-Link Hardware (the companionship now known as the Independent Hardware Group). Danks was acquired by a joint venture of Woolworths Group and Lowe's in 2009.

In 2016, Home Hardware and Thrifty-Link Hardware were sold to Metcash in a 165 million dollar deal as part of Woolworth's decision to drop out the hardware industry.

Stores are independently owned and operated and Home has 189 stores across Australia.

References

External links

Home improvement companies of Australia
Australian companies established in 1993
Retail companies established in 1993
Companies based in Melbourne